Phlegmatospermum is a genus of flowering plants belonging to the family Brassicaceae.

Its native range is Southern Australia.

Species:

Phlegmatospermum cochlearinum 
Phlegmatospermum drummondii 
Phlegmatospermum eremaeum 
Phlegmatospermum richardsii

References

Brassicaceae
Brassicaceae genera